Hasna Benhassi (born 1 June 1978) is a retired Moroccan middle-distance runner. She competed at the 2000, 2004 and 2008 Olympics and won two medals in the 800 m event, in 2004 and 2008. At the world championships she won a gold medal over 1500 m indoors in 2001 and silver medals over 800 m outdoors in 2005 and 2007. In 2004, she was named Sportsperson of the Year in Morocco after a survey conducted by the Moroccan Radio among 43 press institutions.

Benhassi is married to the fellow Olympic middle-distance runner Mouhssin Chehibi; they have a daughter named Farah.

References

External links 

 
 

1978 births
Living people
Sportspeople from Marrakesh
Moroccan female middle-distance runners
Olympic athletes of Morocco
Olympic silver medalists for Morocco
Olympic bronze medalists for Morocco
Athletes (track and field) at the 2000 Summer Olympics
Athletes (track and field) at the 2004 Summer Olympics
Athletes (track and field) at the 2008 Summer Olympics
Medalists at the 2008 Summer Olympics
Medalists at the 2004 Summer Olympics
World Athletics Championships athletes for Morocco
World Athletics Championships medalists
Olympic silver medalists in athletics (track and field)
Olympic bronze medalists in athletics (track and field)
Mediterranean Games gold medalists for Morocco
Athletes (track and field) at the 1997 Mediterranean Games
Mediterranean Games medalists in athletics
World Athletics Indoor Championships winners
20th-century Moroccan women
21st-century Moroccan women